Philipp Leichner was a Swiss footballer. He played as midfielder.

Between the years 1914 and 1915 he played for FC Basel. He was also a member of the FC Basel board of directors. He presided the club's board for a short period during 1915.

References

Sources
 Rotblau: Jahrbuch Saison 2017/2018. Publisher: FC Basel Marketing AG. 
 Die ersten 125 Jahre. Publisher: Josef Zindel im Friedrich Reinhardt Verlag, Basel. 
 Verein "Basler Fussballarchiv" Homepage

FC Basel players
Swiss men's footballers
Association football midfielders
Swiss football chairmen and investors